Juan Antonini (born 4 March 1999) is an Argentine professional footballer who plays as a centre-back for Spanish club Coruxo FC.

Career
Antonini began in the youth set-up of local side Eclipse Villegas. He later left to join River Plate's academy, though only spent seven months with them before returning to his former club. In 2015, Antonini signed for Sarmiento. Iván Delfino moved Antonini into their first-team squad in the 2018–19 Primera B Nacional, with his professional debut coming in a victory away to Chacarita Juniors on 23 February 2019; having previously been an unused substitute for fixtures versus Santamarina and Temperley.

In August 2021, Antonini moved to Spanish Segunda División RFEF club Coruxo FC.

Personal life
Antonini is the brother of Fermín and nephew of Rubén Piaggio, both of whom have been professional footballers. As were other family members, including his father and grandfather, for teams in the General Villegas region.

Career statistics
.

References

External links

1999 births
Living people
Sportspeople from Buenos Aires Province
Argentine footballers
Argentine expatriate footballers
Association football defenders
Primera Nacional players
Segunda Federación players
Club Atlético Sarmiento footballers
Coruxo FC players
Argentine expatriate sportspeople in Spain
Expatriate footballers in Spain